Fatih Akin (Turkish: Fatih Akın, born 25 August 1973) is a German film director, screenwriter and producer of Turkish descent. He has won numerous awards for his films, including the Golden Bear at the Berlin Film Festival for his film Head-On (2004), Best Screenplay at the Cannes Film Festival for his film The Edge of Heaven (2007), and the Golden Globe Award for Best Foreign Language Film for his film In the Fade (2017).

Early life 
Akin was born in Hamburg to Turkish parents. He has one brother, Cem Akin, who works as an actor. He attended the University of Fine Arts of Hamburg to study visual communications and graduated in 2000.

Akin has been married to German-Mexican actress Monique Obermüller since 2004. The couple live in Hamburg-Altona, close to where he was raised. They have two children.

Career 
Akin made his debut as director of a full-length film as early as 1998 with Short Sharp Shock (Kurz und schmerzlos), which brought him the "Bronze Leopard" award at the Locarno International Film Festival in Switzerland and the "Pierrot", the Bavarian Film Award for Best New Director in Munich the same year. Since then he has directed feature films such as In July (Im Juli) in 2000, We forgot to go back (Wir haben vergessen zurückzukehren) in 2001 and Solino''' in 2002.

His fourth film, Head-On (Gegen die Wand), starring Sibel Kekilli, was a major success in 2004 and received several prizes, among them the Golden Bear award at the Berlin Film Festival and the "Best Film" and the "Audience Award" at the 2004 European Film Awards.

In 2005, he directed a documentary about the Istanbul music scene, Crossing the Bridge: The Sound of Istanbul, which includes musicians such as Ceza, Sezen Aksu, Aynur Doğan and Brenna MacCrimmon. It is narrated by a member of a German experimental band Einstürzende Neubauten, Alexander Hacke, who also produced music for Head-On.

In 2007, Akin's The Edge of Heaven, a German-Turkish cross-cultural tale of loss, mourning and forgiveness, won the prize for Best Screenplay at the 60th Cannes Film Festival in 2007. On 24 October 2007 the same film was awarded the first edition of the LUX prize for European cinema by the European Parliament.

About the comedy Soul Kitchen (2009) he has said he chose this more light-hearted film because he needed a break after making the "tough" films Head-On and The Edge of Heaven before making his next planned film The Devil. "But", he says, "now I feel ready to finish the trilogy".

In 2012, his documentary film Polluting Paradise was screened in the Special Screenings section at the 2012 Cannes Film Festival.

His 2014 film The Cut has been selected to compete for the Golden Lion at the 71st Venice International Film Festival.

In 2017, Akin's film In the Fade was selected to compete for the Palme d'Or in the main competition section at the 2017 Cannes Film Festival. At Cannes that year, Diane Kruger won the Best Actress award. The film was subsequently selected as the German entry for the Best Foreign Language Film at the 90th Academy Awards, making the December shortlist. In the Fade won the Golden Globe for Best Foreign Language Film.

 Awards 
 1998 Bavarian Film Awards, Best New Director
 2004 Golden Bear at the Berlin Film Festival
 2004 European Film Awards, Best Film, Audience Award
 2007 Antalya Golden Orange Film Festival Golden Orange Award, Best Director
 2007 Bavarian Film Awards, Best Director
 2007 LUX Prize for European Cinema awarded by European Parliament
 2007 Cannes Film Festival, Best Screenplay
 2010 Order of Merit of the Federal Republic of Germany for his contribution in depicting the problems of Turkish-Germans.
 2018 Golden Globe Award, Best Foreign Language Film
 Filmography 

Collaborations

 References 

Bibliography
 Barbara Kosta, "Transcultural Exchanges: Fatih Akin's Crossing the Bridge: The Sound of Istanbul (2005)," in Martinson, Steven D. / Schulz, Renate A. (Eds./hg.), Transcultural German Studies / Deutsch als Fremdsprache: Building Bridges / Brücken bauen'' (Bern etc., Peter Lang, 2008) (Jahrbuch für Internationale Germanistik, Reihe A: Kongressberichte, 94),

External links 

 
 Fatih Akin Bibliography (via UC Berkeley)
 Rocking Istanbul A talk with Daniel Bax on the film "Crossing the Bridge", tour guides and Vikings, music divas and the responsibilities of critical acclaim at signandsight.com

1973 births
Living people
Best Director German Film Award winners
Best Director Golden Orange Award winners
Directors of Golden Bear winners
European Film Award for Best Screenwriter winners
Film people from Hamburg
German people of Turkish descent
Recipients of the Cross of the Order of Merit of the Federal Republic of Germany
University of Fine Arts of Hamburg alumni
Cannes Film Festival Award for Best Screenplay winners